Joe Lee (born 6 October 1989, in London) is a professional squash player who represents England. He reached a career-high world ranking of World No. 29 in May 2014.

References

External links 
 
 

1989 births
Living people
English male squash players